Château de Pouy-sur-Vannes is a listed historic château in Pouy-sur-Vannes, Aube, France.

History
The château was built in the 16th century.

In 1973, Countess La Noé donated it to the Legion of Honor Association, who used it as a retreat and conference. By 2012, due to the cost of maintaining the chateau, they listed it for sale. It was acquired by Chilean-born American interior designer Juan Pablo Molyneux in 1973. By 2014, he had redesigned the interiors.

Architectural significance
It has been listed as a monument historique by the French Ministry of Culture since 1969.

References

Pouy-sur-Vannes
Monuments historiques of Grand Est
Pouy-sur-Vannes